The 1909 Trinity Bantams football team represented the Trinity College during the 1909 college football season.

Schedule

Notes

References

Trinity
Trinity Bantams football seasons
Trinity Bantams football